Ikiru aka Ikiru Genzai or IKR1 (born in Moscow, USSR in 1980 as Daniel Nemagiev, Даниил Немагиев) is a Russian-American film director.

Biography
Ikiru grew up in both Moscow and New York City's Lower East Side. Having obtained a Communication Arts degree in 1999, he assumed the alias Ikiru (Japanese: "to live") Genzai (Japanese: "now") in homage to Akira Kurosawa  film Ikiru and a character in it. Under this alias he became a member of several conceptual, politically-conscious graphic design collectives such as the Pencilninja Company and GTS (Group for Tactical Subversion).

From 2003 to 2009 Ikiru attended the Deutsche Film und Fernsehakademie Berlin (The German Film and Television Academy) in Berlin, Germany.

Adhering to a 60's-70s auteur tradition, Ikiru's work creatively explores and interprets social ailments from an underdog perspective.

Filmography

References

3. Interview on Ralf aka Sex in the Desert for ExBerliner magazine. http://www.exberliner.com/culture/film/ralf-aka-sex-in-der-wuste/

External links

44. I'm'a get my cousins. Full feature in HD
44. I'm'a get my Cousins imdb page
Ralf aka Sex in the Desert. Full feature in HD
Ralf aka Sex in the Desert on facebook
Ralf aka Sex in the Desert official website
Rabbit and Luck. Full feature
Ikiru Genzai on vimeo
Ikiru Genzai on pinterest
Ikiru Genzai on twitter

Russian film directors
1980 births
Living people